The left-wing uprisings against the Bolsheviks, known in anarchist literature as the Third Russian Revolution, were a series of rebellions, uprisings, and revolts against the Bolsheviks by oppositional left-wing organizations and groups that started soon after the October Revolution, continued through the years of the Russian Civil War, and lasted into the first years of Bolshevik rule of the Soviet Union. They were led or supported by left-wing groups such as some factions of the Socialist Revolutionary Party, Left Socialist-Revolutionaries, Mensheviks, and anarchists. Generally, the uprisings began in 1918 because of the Bolshevik assault on Soviet democracy, the signing of the Treaty of Brest-Litovsk (which many saw as giving overly generous concessions to the Central Powers also seen by some as limiting the revolutionary potential causing the workers, soldiers and peasantry outside the Soviet state to rebel against the continuing strife caused by the war), and opposition to Bolshevik socioeconomic policy.  The Bolsheviks grew increasingly hard-line during the decisive and brutal years following the October Revolution. These rebellions and insurrections occurred mostly during and after the Russian Civil War, until around 1924, though there did exist various small-scale insurgencies until World War II.

The Bolsheviks fought the forces of the pro-Romanov monarchists, reformist Social Democrats, former Imperial Army officers and soldiers in the anti-communist White Armies along with several foreign nations sending in interventionist forces, aid and supplies for the White Armies. Despite this, Vladimir Lenin regarded the left-wing opposition as the most threatening the Bolshevik regime faced, describing the Kronstadt rebellion as "undoubtedly more dangerous than Denikin, Yudenich, and Kolchak combined".

Generally speaking, right-wing enemies of the Bolsheviks were fought by the Red Army, because they existed primarily outside the territory it controlled, and left-wing enemies were dealt with by the Cheka, as they were usually within this territory.

Background

In February 1917, the Russian Empire was overthrown in a revolution and the republican Russian Provisional Government was established in place of the Tsarist autocracy. Initially, the liberal cadet Georgy Lvov was appointed as president of the nascent republic but, unable to rally sufficient support, he was replaced by the Socialist Revolutionary Alexander Kerensky. Assemblies of workers, peasants, and soldiers known as Soviets, which had appeared spontaneously in the 1905 revolution, began to re-emerge throughout the country.

The dominating parts of the Mensheviks and the Socialist Revolutionary Party supported the continuation of Russian involvement in World War I. The Bolsheviks called the war an inter-imperialist war and called for the revolutionary defeat of their own imperialist government. Within the Mensheviks and the Socialist Revolutionists, there did exist factions that also opposed the war and the government (the Menshevik-Internationalists and Left SRs respectively), but much of their leadership was involved in both. In the July Days of 1917, the Menshevik and Socialist Revolutionary parties supported the suppression of the Bolsheviks, who were forming part of a rival government in Petrograd.

Although the Russian Republic was officially proclaimed in September, the provisional government was unable to hold off the rise of the Petrograd Soviet. The Bolshevik Party came to power in the October Revolution of 1917 through simultaneous election in the most prominent soviets and an organized uprising supported by military mutiny. A detachment of anarchist sailors from Kronstadt, led by Anatoli Zhelezniakov, stormed the Winter Palace, abolishing the Provisional Government. Several of the main reasons for which much of the population supported the Bolshevik uprising were to end the war and hold a social revolution, exemplified by the slogan "Peace, Land, Bread".

In November 1917, the Bolsheviks took advantage of a temporary majority in the Second All-Russian Congress of Soviets of Workers' and Soldiers' Deputies, due to the disorganization of the other parties after the overthrow of the Provisional Government. The Bolsheviks converted the All-Russian Central Executive Committee (previously organized to coordinate the soviets) into an organ of state power, largely independent from the soviets. The Council of People's Commissars was subsequently formed to take control of the country's economy. Soon after, the Cheka was established as a secret police force, headed by the Polish aristocrat Felix Dzerzhinsky.

The Bolsheviks invited the Left SRs and Menshevik-Internationalists to join the Central Executive Committee of the newly established Russian Soviet Federative Socialist Republic. The Mensheviks and Right SRs walked out of the soviet congress in response to the new shift in power. The majority of SRs split to form the Left SRs and joined the Bolshevik coalition government, supporting the Bolsheviks' immediate enactment of the Socialist Revolutionary Party's land redistribution program. The Left SRs were given four Commissar positions and held high posts within the Cheka. However, the Left SRs diverged with the Bolsheviks on the issue of the war, after the government began negotiations with the Central Powers.

Anarchist divisions

Anarchists, like the Socialist Revolutionaries, were divided. Some supported the Bolsheviks, holding minor positions in the government, some were neutral, and some actively resisted. Anarchists that supported the Soviet government were referred to as "Soviet anarchists", by anti-Bolshevik anarchists, and were lauded by Lenin in August 1919 as "the most dedicated supporters of Soviet power".

Dissolution of the Constituent Assembly, early Constituent Assembly rebellions
The Constituent Assembly had been a demand of the Bolsheviks against the Provisional Government, which kept delaying it. After the October Revolution the elections were run by the body appointed by the previous Provisional Government. It was based on universal suffrage, but used party lists from before the Left-Right SR split. The anti-soviet Right SRs took the majority of the seats but this reflected the opposite of reality: the majority of SRs and the people were pro-soviet. Lenin's Theses on the Constituent Assembly argued in Pravda that because of class conflicts, conflicts with Ukraine, and with the Kadet-Kaledin uprising formal democracy was impossible. He argued the Constituent Assembly must unconditionally accept sovereignty of the soviet government or it would be dealt with "by revolutionary means".

On December 30, 1917, the SR Nikolai Avksentiev and some followers were arrested for organizing a conspiracy. This was the first time Bolsheviks used this kind of repression against a socialist party. Izvestia said the arrest was not related to his membership in the Constituent Assembly.

On January 4, 1918, the VTsIK made a resolution saying the slogan "all power to the constituent assembly" was counterrevolutionary and equivalent to "down with the soviets".

The Constituent Assembly met on January 18, 1918. The Right SR Chernov was elected president defeating the Bolshevik supported candidate, the Left SR Maria Spiridonova. The majority refused to accept sovereignty of the Soviet government, and in response the Bolsheviks and Left SRs walked out. It was dispersed by an armed guard, sailor Zheleznyakov. A simultaneous demonstration in favor of the Constituent Assembly was dispersed with force, but there was little protest afterward as people, in general, supported the Bolsheviks.

The first large Cheka repression with some killings began against the libertarian socialists of Petrograd in mid-April 1918. On May 1, 1918, a pitched battle took place in Moscow between the anarchists and the police. (P.Avrich. G Maximoff)

Constituent Assembly uprising
The Union of Regeneration was founded in Moscow in April 1918 as an underground agency organizing democratic resistance to the Bolshevik dictatorship, composed of the Popular Socialists, Right Socialist Revolutionaries, and Defensists, among others. They were tasked with propping up anti-Bolshevik forces and to create a Russian state system based on civil liberties, patriotism, and state-consciousness with the goal to liberate the country from the "Germano-Bolshevik" yoke.

On May 7, 1918, the Eighth Party Council of the Party of Socialist Revolutionaries commenced in Moscow and recognized the Union's leading role, putting aside political ideology and class for the purpose of Russia's salvation. They decided to start an uprising against the Bolsheviks with the goal of reconvening the Russian Constituent Assembly. While preparations were under way, the Czechoslovak Legions overthrew Bolshevik rule in Siberia, the Urals and the Volga region in late May-early June 1918 and the center of SR activity shifted there. On June 8, 1918, five Constituent Assembly members formed the All-Russian Committee of Members of the Constituent Assembly (Komuch) in Samara and declared it the new supreme authority in the country. The Social Revolutionary Provisional Government of Autonomous Siberia came to power on June 29, 1918, after the uprising in Vladivostok.

Left SRs disagreements
The Left SRs were dismayed about the signing of the Treaty of Brest-Litovsk gave up large amounts of territory, leaving the government in protest in March 1918. They also had the view that the "imperialist war should be transformed into a revolutionary war" so as to spread the revolution across the region (Western Europe primarily, and Germany in particular) and most crucially for them, the strife and possibly lack of victory would disillusion the working classes and soldiery of the warring states to rebel in the form of socialist revolution or "bring the war home" in the form of class/civil war.  This is also a view held by Rosa Luxemburg, who viewed the continuation of support for the war by Germans and the failure of large successful uprising to take place caused in part by the Brest-Litvosk Treaty, which the German government could propagandize to the German working class and soldiery so as to have their continued support for the war.

Mensheviks and SRs excluded from soviets
At the 5th All-Russia Congress of Soviets of July 4, 1918, the Left Socialist-Revolutionaries had 352 delegates compared to 745 Bolsheviks out of 1132 total. The Left SRs raised disagreements on the suppression of rival parties, the death penalty, and mainly, the Treaty of Brest-Litovsk. The Bolsheviks excluded the Right SRs and Mensheviks from the government on 14 June for associating with counterrevolutionaries and seeking to "organize armed attacks against the workers and peasants" (though Mensheviks had not supported them), while the Left SRs advocated forming a government of all socialist parties. The Left SRs agreed with extrajudicial execution of political opponents to stop the counterrevolution, but opposed having the government legally pronouncing death sentences, an unusual position that is best understood within the context of the group's terrorist past. The Left SRs strongly opposed the Treaty of Brest-Litovsk, and opposed Trotsky's insistence that no one try to attack German troops in Ukraine.

Left SR Uprising

Defeated at the Congress, the Left SRs pursued their aim of sabotaging the Treaty of Brest-Litovsk and dragging Soviet Russia back into war with Germany by using their positions within the Cheka to assassinate the German Ambassador in Moscow, Count Wilhelm von Mirbach, on July 6, 1918. The Leadership of the Left SRs incorrectly believed this assassination would lead to a widespread popular uprising in support of their aims. They claimed to be leading an uprising against peace with Germany and not necessarily against the Bolsheviks and Soviet power.

The main rebel force was a detachment commanded by Dmitry Ivanovich Popov, a Left SR and member of the Cheka. About 1,800 revolutionaries took part in the insurrection. They seized the telephone exchange and telegraph office. During the two days that they remained in control there, they sent out several manifestos, bulletins and telegrams in the name of the Left SR Central Committee declaring that the Left SRs had taken over power and that their action had been welcomed by the whole people.

Left SRs also started insurrections in Petrograd (Saint Petersburg), Vologda, Arzamas, Murom, Yaroslavl, Veliky Ustyug, Rybinsk and other cities. A telegram from the Left S. R. Central Committee stating that the Left SRs had seized power in Moscow, was sent to M. A. Muravyov, a Left SR and Commander of the Eastern Front (World War I). On the pretext of attacking the Germans, he seized Simbirsk (later Ulyanovsk) and marched his forces on Moscow in support of the revolutionaries.

The result of the Left SR Uprising was the suppression of the Left SRs, the last major independent party other than the Bolsheviks, leaving the Bolsheviks as the only party in government.

Subsequent uprisings included the Tambov Rebellion and the Kronstadt rebellion.

Aims and slogans
Socialist Revolutionaries tended to claim to be fighting to restore the February Revolution. Some anarchists used the slogan "Third Revolution". The slogan was later used during the Kronstadt rebellion also.

Repression
Lenin sent the telegrams to "introduce mass terror" in Nizhny Novgorod in response to the civilian uprising there, and "crush" peasants in Penza who protested to requisition of their grain by military detachments.

The Black Book of Communism: ""It is quite clear that preparations are being made for a White Guard uprising in Nizhni Novgorod," wrote Lenin in a telegram on 9 August 1918 to the president of the Executive Committee of the Nizhni Novgorod soviet, in response to a report about peasant protests against requisitioning. "Your first response must be to establish a dictatorial troika (i.e., you, Markin, and one other person) and introduce mass terror, shooting or deporting the hundreds of prostitutes who are causing all the soldiers to drink, all the ex-officers, etc. There is not a moment to lose; you must act resolutely, with massive reprisals. Immediate execution for anyone caught in possession of a firearm. Massive deportations of Mensheviks and other suspect elements."  The next day Lenin sent a similar telegram to the Central Executive Committee of the Penza soviet:

Assassination attempts

In the morning of August 30, 1918, a Social Revolutionary Leonid Kannegisser, who was Boris Savinkov's comrade, killed the chief of the Cheka in Petrograd, Moisei Uritsky, in his office.

On August 30, 1918 Lenin survived an attempted assassination by Fanny Kaplan leaving a bullet in his neck. This contributed to the strokes that eventually caused his death.

On September 5, 1918 the Cheka gave responsibility for targeting opposing parties on the left such as the Social Revolutionaries and other anti-Bolshevik groups, chiefly the anarchists, by the policy of Red Terror.

Reinstatement of Mensheviks
In November 1918, the Sixth All-Russian Congress of Soviets met. They approved an amnesty, ordering release of those detained by the Cheka who had no definite charges within two weeks of arrest, and of hostages except those needed to guarantee hostages held by their enemies. They also held out an olive branch to the other socialist parties. The Menshevik conference in October 1918 had declared military support to the Soviet Government but still opposed the Cheka and terror. On November 30 the VTsIK annulled the exclusion of the Mensheviks except those who were still allied with enemies.

Constituent Assembly and White Armies
The All-Russian Constituent Assembly Committee had the support of the Czechoslovak Legions and was able to spread its authority over much of the Volga-Kama region. However, most of the Siberia and Urals regions were controlled by a patchwork of ethnic, Cossack, military and liberal-rightist local governments, which constantly clashed with the Committee. The Committee functioned until September 1918, eventually growing to about 90 Constituent Assembly members, when The State Conference representing all the anti-Bolshevik local governments from the Volga to the Pacific Ocean formed the coalition of Provisional All-Russian Government (aka the Ufa Directory) with the ultimate goal of re-convening the Constituent Assembly once the circumstances permitted:

The All-Russian Constituent Assembly Committee continued functioning as "Congress of Members of the Constituent Assembly" but had no real power, although the Directory pledged to support it:

Initially, the agreement had the support of the Socialist Revolutionary Central Committee which delegated two of its right-wing members, Avksentiev and Zenzinov, to the five member Ufa Directory. However, when Viktor Chernov arrived in Samara on September 19, 1918, he was able to persuade the Central Committee to withdraw support from the Directory because he viewed it as too conservative and the SR presence there as insufficient. This put the Directory in a political vacuum and two months later, in November 1918, The Social Revolutionary-Menshevik Provisional Government of Autonomous Siberia was overthrown in the military coup d'état. Kolchak had returned to Omsk on November 16 from an inspection tour. He was approached and refused to take power. On November 18, 1918, Ufa Directory was overthrown by rightwing officers who made Alexander Kolchak the new Supreme Ruler (Verkhovnyi Pravitel), and he promoted himself to Admiral. The Socialist-Revolutionary (SR) Directory leader and members were arrested on November 18 by a troop of Cossacks under ataman I. N. Krasilnikov. The remaining cabinet members met and voted for Kolchak to become the head of government with dictatorial powers. The arrested SR politicians were expelled from Siberia and ended up in Europe. After the fall of the Ufa Directory, Chernov formulated what he called the "third path" against both the Bolsheviks and the liberal-rightist White movement, but the SRs' attempts to assert themselves as an independent force were unsuccessful and the party, always fractious, began to disintegrate. On the Right, Nikolai Avksentiev and Vladimir Zenzinov went abroad with Kolchak's permission. On the Left, some SRs became reconciled with the Bolsheviks. The SR leaders in Russia denounced Kolchak and called for him to be killed. Victor Chernov tried to stage an uprising against Kolchak. Their activities resulted in the Omsk Uprising on December 22, 1918, which was put down by Cossacks, who summarily executed almost 500 revolutionaries.

Mensheviks and Georgia

Mensheviks took power in Georgia and in 1918 the Democratic Republic of Georgia was proclaimed with Noe Zhordania becoming the head. The area was forcefully sovietized by February 25, 1921. Lenin recommended "a policy of concessions in relation to the Georgian intelligentsia and small traders" and "a coalition with Noe Zhordania or similar Georgian Mensheviks". Most Menshevik leaders fled to Paris.

Reinstatement of SRs
In January 1919 the SR Central Committee decided that the Bolsheviks were the lesser of two evils and gave up armed struggle against them. The SRs opened negotiations with the Bolsheviks and in February 1919 the SR People's Army joined with the Red Army. The VTsIK resolved on February 25, 1919 to reinstate the SRs except those who continued to directly or indirectly support counterrevolution.

SR disbanded 
The Bolsheviks let the SR Central Committee re-establish itself in Moscow and start publishing a party newspaper in March 1919. After the defeat of the White Army in Russia, the party tried to reorganise and to re-establish contacts with its provincial organisations; despite numerous requests from party sections in East Russia and by exiled members in Europe, the Central Committee refused to take armed action against the Bolsheviks, and also supported them in the ensuing war against Poland. These decisions were confirmed by the Tenth Party Council in 1920. Despite that, Lenin accused the party of cooperation with counter-revolutionary forces and SR Central Committee members were arrested. Chernov went undercover and eventually was forced to flee Russia and the party was officially banned in 1921, after the Tenth Congress of the Russian Communist Party (Bolshevik).

Repression
A typical report from a Cheka department stated: "Yaroslavl Province, 23 June 1919. The uprising of deserters in the Petropavlovskaya volost has been put down. The families of the deserters have been taken as hostages. When we started to shoot one person from each family, the Greens began to come out of the woods and surrender. Thirty-four deserters were shot as an example".

SR trial

The imprisoned SR Central Committee members were put on trial starting June 8, 1922. The trial was the first of the many political trials of Soviet Russia and ended with twelve death sentences and several years of hard labour sentences.

Other revolts
The first large CHEKA action against alleged anarchists where people were killed was in mid April 1918 in Petrograd. Then at the end of April and beginning of May coordinated CHEKIST attacks against alleged anarchists were launched in both Petrograd and Moscow. ( P. Avrich. G. Maximoff. ) These violent attacks without warning from the Bolsheviks forced anarchists underground and prompted measured retaliation by them in self-defense. Anarchists in Rostov, Ekaterinoslav (Dnipro) and Bryansk broke into prisons to liberate the prisoners and issued fiery proclamations calling on the people to revolt against the Bolshevik regime. The Anarchist Battle Detachments attacked the Whites, Reds and Germans alike. Many peasants joined the revolt, attacking their enemies with pitchforks and sickles. Meanwhile, in Moscow, the Underground Anarchists were formed by Kazimir Kovalevich and Piotr Sobolev to be the shock troops of their revolution, infiltrating Bolshevik ranks and striking when least expected. On 25 September 1919, the Underground Anarchists struck the Bolsheviks with "their heaviest blow against the 'oppressors'".

Further repression
However, strikes continued. In January 1920, Lenin sent a telegram to Izhevsk telling that "I am surprised that you are taking the matter so lightly and are not immediately executing large numbers of strikers for the crime of sabotage."

In June 1920, female workers in Tula who refused to work on Sunday were arrested and sent to labor camps.

Revolutionary Insurgent Army of Ukraine

The Revolutionary Insurgent Army of Ukraine, led by anarchist and former Red Army leader Nestor Makhno, took control of most of the southern Ukraine and Crimea after its abandonment by Red Army troops in 1919. Makhno's forces fought on the side of the Bolsheviks and played an important role in the eventual defeat of the White Armies.  However, they were at odds with the Bolshevik view of a unitary Bolshevik dominated political movement.  Occasionally Makhno's Black Army troops fought Red Army forces, whom the Ukrainian anarchists had viewed with mistrust after Chekist and Red Army raids on anarchist centers, including arrests, detentions, and executions commencing in May 1918.

For his part, Makhno stated his support for "free worker-peasant soviets" independent of centralized control by Moscow.  Makhno, a rural anarchist, viewed the Bolsheviks as urban dictators out-of-touch with the people, opposing the Bolshevik-controlled  "Cheka [secret police]... and similar compulsory authoritative and disciplinary institutions".  He called for "[f]reedom of speech, press, assembly, unions and the like". In practice, Makhno's Insurgent Army, the Military Revolutionary Council, and the Ukrainian anarchists' political arm, the Congress of the Confederation of Anarchists Groups (NABAT) formed an overall government over the area they controlled, though they did permit local self-governing autonomous committees of peasants.  Like the Red Army, they used forced conscription and summary executions, though as a relatively popular native Ukrainian movement, these measures were not used on the same scale as that of the Bolshevik Red Army.  In the areas under his military control, the Military Revolutionary Council banned all opposition parties, and like the Bolsheviks, used two secret police counter-intelligence forces: the Razedka and the Kommissiya Protivmakhnovskikh Del.

Some members of the Bolshevik Central Committees considered allowing an independent area for Makhno's libertarian experiment, an idea fiercely opposed by both Lenin and Leon Trotsky, War Commissar of the Red Army. After each successful repulse of White Army forces, Trotsky ordered fresh attacks against Makhno and the Anarchist Black Army, halting only when White forces threatened to once again defeat the Red Army in the field.  At the instructions of Moscow, the Cheka sent two agents to assassinate Makhno in 1920.  After repudiation of two military alliances, and the final defeat of White General Wrangel in the Crimea, Trotsky ordered the mass executions of Makhnovist sympathizers, followed by the liquidation of many of Makhno's subordinate commanders and his entire headquarters staff at a "joint planning conference" in November 1920.  By August 1921, Makhno and the remainder of the Anarchist Black Army had been forced into exile.

Revolts against grain requisitioning
Protests against grain requisitioning of the peasantry were a major component of the Tambov rebellion and similar uprisings; Lenin's New Economic Policy was introduced as a concession.

The policies of "food dictatorship" proclaimed by the Bolsheviks in May 1918 sparked violent resistance in numerous districts of European Russia: revolts and clashes between the peasants and the Red Army were reported in Voronezh, Tambov, Penza, Saratov and in the districts of Kostroma, Moscow, Novgorod, Petrograd, Pskov and Smolensk. The revolts were bloodily crushed by the Bolsheviks: in the Voronezh Oblast, the Red Guards killed sixteen peasants during the pacification of the village, while another village was shelled with artillery in order to force the peasants to surrender and in the Novgorod Oblast the rebelling peasants were dispersed with machine-gun fire from a train sent by a detachment of Latvian Red Army soldiers. While the Bolsheviks immediately denounced the rebellion as orchestrated by the SRs, there is actually no evidence that they were involved into peasant violence, which they deemed as counterproductive.

Kronstadt Rebellion

A key development in Bolshevik consolidation of state power in Russia occurred in March, 1921, with the Kronstadt rebellion. The outset of the year was marked by strikes and demonstrations - in both Moscow and Petrograd, as well as the countryside - due to discontent with the results of policies that made up war communism. The Bolsheviks, in response to the protests, enacted martial law and sent the Red Army to disperse the workers. This was followed up by mass arrests executed by the Cheka. Repression and minor concessions only temporarily quelled the discontent as Petrograd protests continued that year in March. This time the factory workers were joined by sailors stationed on the nearby island-fort of Kronstadt. Disappointed in the direction of the Bolshevik government, the rebels demanded a series of reforms including: reduction in Bolshevik privileges, newly elected soviet councils to include socialist and anarchist groups, economic freedom for peasants and workers, dissolution of the bureaucratic governmental organs created during the civil war, and the restoration of worker rights for the working class. The workers and sailors of the Kronstadt rebellion were promptly crushed by Red Army forces, with a thousand rebels killed in battle and another thousand executed the following weeks, with many more fleeing abroad and to the countryside. These events coincided with the 10th Congress of the Russian Communist Party (Bolsheviks). There, Lenin argued that the soviets and the principle of democratic centralism within the Bolshevik party still assured democracy. However, faced with support for Kronstadt within Bolshevik ranks, Lenin also issued a "temporary" ban on factions in the Russian Communist Party. This ban remained until the revolutions of 1989 and, according to some critics, made the democratic procedures within the party an empty formality, and helped Stalin to consolidate much more authority under the party. Soviets were transformed into the bureaucratic structure that existed for the rest of the history of the Soviet Union and were completely under the control of party officials and the politburo.

The Kronstadt rebellion was led by  Stepan Petrichenko. He initiated the change from a protest to an open rebellion by spreading a rumor that the Bolsheviks were coming to arrest everyone. The rebels called for free elections to regional councils (soviets) and an end to grain requisitioning.

Despite protests from notorious anarchists like Emma Goldman and Alexander Berkman, the revolt was suppressed by Bolsheviks.

Numerous minor rebellions
Numerous attacks and assassinations occurred frequently until these rebellions finally petered out in 1922. Anarchists participated in almost all of the attacks the Left SR's organized, and carried out many on their own initiative. The most celebrated figures of these rebellions, Lev Chernyi and Fanya Baron were both Anarchists.

Results
The end result of these rebellions was the suppression of rival socialist parties and anarchists, and economic concessions from the Bolsheviks with the New Economic Policy.

Mensheviks were suppressed after the Kronstadt Uprising and the forceful sovietization of Menshevik Georgia. A number of prominent Mensheviks emigrated thereafter. Julius Martov who was suffering from ill health at this time went to Germany.

The Left SRs collapsed as a party by 1922 and existed as small cells through 1925.

Later claims
During the Moscow Trials in 1937, it was claimed that Leon Trotsky, Lev Kamenev, and Grigory Zinoviev were involved in the Left SR uprising.

Yuri Felshtinsky claimed the Left SR Uprising was staged by the Bolsheviks as a pretext to discredit the Left SRs. L. M. Ovrutskii and Anatolii Izrailevich Razgon produced research to refute this.

See also
Anarchism in Russia
Anarcho-communism
Anti-Leninism
Anti-Stalinist left
Black Guards
Kronstadt Rebellion
Tambov Rebellion
Left communism
Left Opposition
Makhnovtchina 
Left Socialist-Revolutionaries
Permanent Revolution
Ryutin affair
World revolution
War communism

Footnotes

Notes

References

External links
Paul Avrich, "Russian Anarchists and the Civil War"
"The Kronstadt Revolution"
Nadezhda Krupskaya, "Ilyich Moves to Moscow, His First Months of Work in Moscow"
V. I. Lenin, "Interview Granted To An Izvestia Correspondent In Connection With The Left Socialist-Revolutionary Revolt"
"Poole to Lansing on assassination of Count Mirbach"
"Pravda o Kronshtadte - The Truth About Kronstadt," Volia Rossii, 1921
Leon Trotsky, "Revolt of the Left SRs"
'Beyond Kronstadt; the Bolsheviks in power', Mark Kosman
Maps of Europe and Russia during the Left-wing uprisings at omniatlas.com

1918 in Russia
20th-century rebellions
20th-century revolutions
Aftermath of World War I in Russia and in the Soviet Union
Anarchism in Russia
Anarchist revolutions
Anti-Bolshevik uprisings
Communist revolutions
Conflicts in 1918
Protests in the Soviet Union
Rebellions in Russia
Rebellions in the Soviet Union
Soviet democracy movements